Adrian Saxe is an American ceramic artist who was born in Glendale, California in 1943. He lives and works in Los Angeles, California.

Biography
Saxe studied at the Chouinard Art Institute (Los Angeles, California) from 1965 to 1969 and earned a B.F.A. degree at the California Institute of the Arts (Valencia, California).  Saxe's early works were primarily site-specific sculpture that employed large arrays of modular ceramic sections.  Later, he turned to producing ornate vessels.

He has produced work for major solo and group exhibitions around the world and in 1983 he became the first artist fellow in residency at L’Atelier Experimental de Recherche et de Creation de la Manufacture Nationale de Sèvres in France. His work was the subject of a major mid-career survey organized by the Los Angeles County Museum of Art in 1993–94, which traveled to the Museum of Contemporary Art in Shigaraki, Japan, and to the Newark Museum of Art in Newark, NJ.

In a 1993 review of Saxe's work, art critic Christopher Knight wrote:

“With outrageous humor and unspeakable beauty, he makes intensely seductive objects that exploit traditional anthropomorphic qualities associated with ceramics. Having pressed the question of the utility of his own art in a post-industrial world, his work engages us in a dialogue about our own place in a radically shifting cultural universe. The result is that Saxe has become the most significant ceramic artist of his generation.”

Saxe is currently a professor in the Art Department at the University of California, Los Angeles.

Museum collections
 Arizona State University Art Museum, Ceramics Research Center, Tempe, Arizona
 Brooklyn Museum of Art, Brooklyn, New York
 Canton Museum of Art, Canton, Ohio
 Carnegie Museum of Art, Institute and Carnegie Museum of Natural History, Pittsburgh, Philadelphia
 Cooper-Hewitt Museum Smithsonian Institution, National Museum of Design, New York
 Cultural Affairs Commission, County of Los Angeles, California
 Currier Museum of Art, Manchester, New Hampshire
 de Young Museum, San Francisco, California
 Everson Museum of Art, Syracuse, New York
 Gardiner Museum, Ontario, Canada
 Kruithuis Museum, 's-Hertogenbosch, Netherlands
 Long Beach Museum of Art, Long Beach, California
 Los Angeles County Museum of Art, Los Angeles, California
 The Metropolitan Museum of Art, New York
 The Mint Museum, Charlotte, North Carolina
 Musée des Arts Décoratifs, Pavilion de Marsan, Palais de Louvre, Paris
 Musée National de Céramique de Sèvres, Sèvres, France
 Museum of Arts and Design, New York
 Museum of Fine Arts, Houston, Texas
 National Gallery of Australia, Canberra, Australia
 Nelson-Atkins Museum of Art, Kansas City, Missouri
 Nerman Museum of Contemporary Art, Overland Park, Kansas
 Newark Museum, Newark, New Jersey
 Nora Eccles Harrison Museum, Logan, Utah
 Oakland Museum of California, Oakland, California
 Racine Art Museum, Racine, Wisconsin
 Renwick Gallery, National Collection of American Art, Smithsonian Institution, Washington, D.C.
 Rhode Island School of Design Museum of Art, Providence, Rhode Island
 Shigaraki Ceramic Cultural Park, Shigaraki, Japan
 Taipei Fine Arts Museum, Taiwan, R.O.C.
 The Toledo Museum of Art, Toledo, Ohio
 Victoria and Albert Museum, London, England
 The White House Collection of American Crafts, Washington, D.C.

Solo exhibitions
 GRIN—Genetic Robotic Information Nano (Technologies), Frank Lloyd Gallery, Santa Monica, California, 2011
 New Work, Frank Lloyd Gallery, Santa Monica, California, 2004
 Garth Clark Gallery, New York, New York, 2000
 The American Hand, Washington, D.C., 1998
 Wish I may, Wish I might, Frank Lloyd Gallery, Santa Monica, California, Garth Clark Gallery, New York, 1997
 Garth Clark Gallery, New York, New York, 1996
 Garth Clark Gallery, Los Angeles, California, 1995
 Garth Clark Gallery, New York, New York, 1994
 The Clay Art of Adrian Saxe, Los Angeles County Museum of Art traveled to the Museum of Contemporary Ceramic Art, Shigaraki, Japan and Newark Museum, New Jersey (1993–1995)
 Garth Clark Gallery, New York, New York, 1992
 Garth Clark Gallery, Los Angeles, California, 1991
 Garth Clark Gallery, Kansas City, Missouri, 1991
 Garth Clark Gallery, New York, New York, 1990
 Garth Clark Gallery, Los Angeles, California, 1989
 Garth Clark Gallery, New York, New York, 1988
 Art Gallery, University of Missouri, Kansas City, Missouri, 1987
 Garth Clark Gallery, New York, New York, 1987
 Garth Clark Gallery, Los Angeles, California, 1985
 The American Hand, Washington, D.C., 1985
 Garth Clark Gallery, New York, New York, 1985
 Garth Clark Gallery, New York, New York, 1983
 The American Hand, Washington, D.C., 1983
 Thomas Segal Gallery, Boston, Massachusetts, 1983
 Garth Clark Gallery, Los Angeles, California, 1982
 The American Hand, Washington, D.C., 1982
 The American Hand, Washington, D.C., 1980
 The American Hand, Washington, D.C., 1979
 The American Hand, Washington, D.C., 1973
 Canyon Gallery II, Los Angeles, California, 1970

References

Sources
 Galusha, Emily (ed.), What's Clay Got to do with it?, A symposium on ceramics criticism, March 24–25, 1995, Saint Paul, Minn., Northern Clay Center, 1995.
 Levin, Elaine M. (ed.), Movers and Shakers in American Ceramics, Defining Twentieth Century Ceramics, A collection of articles from Ceramics monthly, Westerville, OH, American Ceramic Society, 2003.
 Lynn, Martha Drexler, The Clay Art of Adrian Saxe, Los Angeles, Los Angeles County Museum of Art, 1993.

External links
 adriansaxe.com
 Adrian Saxe at Frank Lloyd Gallery
 Adrian Saxe Artist Talk at Hammer Museum

American ceramists
20th-century American sculptors
Modern sculptors
American potters
1943 births
Living people
People from Glendale, California
Sculptors from California
21st-century American sculptors